In the course of his papacy, Benedict XVI (r. 2005–2013) issued two documents altering certain details of the procedures for electing a pope: De electione romani pontificis on 11 June 2007 and Normas nonnullas on 22 February 2013. These instructions amended the extensive set of rules and procedures issued on 22 February 1996 by his predecessor John Paul II in his apostolic constitution Universi Dominici gregis.

Benedict reversed or modified some innovations John Paul had instituted that dealt with procedures to be followed if a papal conclave lasted more than two weeks. He also modified the cardinals' authority to set the start date of a conclave and tightened the punishment for support personnel who violate their oath of secrecy.

Instructions

De aliquis mutationibus in normis de electione Romani Pontificis
John Paul's 1996 rules had introduced some "radical" innovations that allowed the cardinal electors, after 33 ballots (not counting any ballot taken on the first day of the conclave), to determine by majority vote how to proceed, allowing them to lower the majority needed for election from two-thirds of those voting to as little as a simple majority, and allowing them to restrict the balloting to the candidates who had received the most votes in the preceding ballot. John Paul had then received "more than a few requests", according to Benedict, to restore the traditional requirement of a two-thirds majority. The two-thirds majority requirement had been established by the Third Lateran Council in 1179.

Since participants in a conclave are bound by an oath of secrecy, the impact of these changes on the one conclave where they controlled is unknowable. Observers imagine two opposite effects. During the papal election in 2005, once the votes for Cardinal Joseph Ratzinger exceeded a simple majority, his supporters knew they could continue voting for him until they were able to institute the simple majority rule that John Paul allowed. On the other hand, it is questionable whether Ratzinger would have accepted election on such terms, as the first pope in centuries with the support of a bare majority of the electors.

Benedict issued De aliquis mutationibus in normis de electione Romani Pontificis on 11 June 2007 after two years as pope. In this five-paragraph document, Benedict denied the cardinal electors the options John Paul had allowed them and retained only John Paul's determination that a change was required after many ballots had failed to produce a result. He restored the two-thirds majority rule. He established the procedure that after 33 ballots (still excluding the first day's ballot if any), additional ballots would allow voting only for the two candidates with the greatest number of votes in the preceding ballot, and he excluded those two candidates from participation in the balloting.

Normas nonnullas
Benedict resigned the papacy on 11 February 2013, effective 28 February. On 22 February he issued his second set of instructions on the papal election process, Normas nonnullas. Following his resignation, cardinals had questioned the rule that they delay starting the conclave until 15 days after the papacy fell vacant. Benedict allowed them to begin earlier "if all the Cardinal electors are present" while keeping their ability to delay the start until 20 days pass "for serious reasons". He modified the oath of secrecy to be taken by all support personnel, making excommunication the automatic punishment for violations of the oath, which had previously been punished at the discretion of the new pope.

The cardinals began meeting in General Congregation, including both cardinal electors and those too old to participate in the balloting, on 4 March. The last of the cardinal electors arrived on 7 March, Cardinal Jean-Baptiste Phạm Minh Mẫn of Vietnam. They took advantage of Benedict's modification of the rules and voted on 8 March to begin the conclave on 12 March.

See also
 College of Cardinals
 Motu proprio
 Papal conclave of 2013
 Supermajority

References

External links
De aliquis mutationibus in normis de electione Romani Pontificis; available in French, German and Latin
Normas nonnullas; available in English, French, German, Italian, Latin, Portuguese and Spanish

Election of the Pope
Motu proprio of Pope Benedict XVI
2007 in Christianity
2007 documents
2013 in Christianity
2013 documents